Oh Min-ji (born 29 March 1985) is a South Korean speed skater. She competed in the women's 500 metres at the 2010 Winter Olympics.

References

1985 births
Living people
South Korean female speed skaters
Olympic speed skaters of South Korea
Speed skaters at the 2010 Winter Olympics
Speed skaters from Seoul
Speed skaters at the 2007 Asian Winter Games
21st-century South Korean women